J. Steven Svoboda is a patent lawyer who has been an attorney since 1991. Svoboda is the founder of the California-based organization, Attorneys for the Rights of the Child. As an attorney, Svoboda is involved in educating, writing, and working with the United Nations on behalf of genital integrity issues. He also works as a patent lawyer.

Education
Svoboda graduated cum laude from Harvard Law School in 1991.  Previously, he received a bachelor's degree in Physics and English from the University of California at Los Angeles (UCLA), receiving awards as an Outstanding Student in each of his two majors as well as being one of five Outstanding Seniors chosen from his undergraduate class. He then received a master's degree in Physics from the University of California at Berkeley.

Work

Svoboda has been working as a full-time patent lawyer since May 2004. His first two patents became two of the core patents behind GPS navigation and Yelp. Svoboda founded Attorneys for the Rights of the Child in 1997. Currently in addition to serving as Executive Director of ARC, he works as a patent lawyer for his own law firm as well as for a prominent Chicago-based law firm and practices human rights law in Richmond, California. Steven obtained 37 patents for Fetch Robotics, which Zebra Robotics purchased for $305 million in July 2021.

Steven has been a social crusader since an early age.  He founded ARC in 1997 at the suggestion of Tim Hammond of NOHARMM.  He went to law school to be a human rights lawyer, training in human rights work in three trips to Guatemala, work that included visiting morgues to examine corpses for signs of human rights violations and confronting army generals over military violations.  

Steven co-led an international team (the International NGO Council on Genital Autonomy or INGOCGA) that in March 2022 completed a five-year project by producing a "core report" on human rights that is posted on the ARC and INGOCGA websites for adaptation for future UN submissions by local activists throughout the world, based on the particular protections and/or violations of genital autonomy occurring in their individual countries. Steven also drafted an “intervention” (a written submission) from INGOCGA as a third party non-governmental organization to the UN’s Committee on the Rights of the Child (UNCRC) in a Finnish case involving a parental dispute about circumcising their child.

In October 2013, Steven debated the AAP’s Dr. Michael Brady at the Twentieth Annual Thomas A. Pitts Lectureship in Medical Ethics, held at the Medical University of South Carolina pursuant to a conference titled, “Ethical and Legal Issues in Pediatrics.  Steven proved that activists know the science far better than the Task Force and Brady found himself unable after hearing Svoboda’s five-minute presentation in the seminar to rebut a single one of our arguments. As they each personally told Svoboda, two of the five physician presenters who are not AAP Task Force members were completely convinced by our arguments and went from being pretty strongly pro-circumcision prior to the event to coming to oppose the procedure based on our arguments. The Journal of Law, Medicine and Ethics published the paper by Svoboda and coauthors Bob Van Howe, Peter Adler, which is the longest article Svoboda has ever published and which is already regarded as comprehensive, persuasive, and “groundbreaking.” 

In July and August 2001, Steven and ARC organized a team that traveled to Geneva on behalf of ARC to consult with the United Nations’ (UN’s) Sub-Commission for the Promotion and Protection of Human Rights, making oral and written submissions, the latter of which became part of the official UN record and the first document ever accepted by the UN focusing on male circumcision.  
Steven has presented at twelve consecutive international symposia on genital autonomy and children’s rights, starting in 1996 in Lausanne, Switzerland, with the most recent one held in August 2022 in Atlanta. His presentations were published as papers in all eight of the symposium conference proceeding books published by Plenum/Kluwer. One of Steven’s and ARC’s proudest accomplishments is publication, since 2000, of 39 issues of our free newsletter, which strives to be more or less a newspaper for intactivism.  Our newsletter is carried by all three of the top content providers that electronically provide journals to libraries throughout the world.

Steven was deeply honored after the sad passing in June 2011 of his dear friend, the late, great activist Van Lewis, to be invited to deliver a memorial speech in Van’s honor at Van’s memorial service in Tallahassee.  Many activists contributed to Steven’s memorial talk.
Both in his writing and in his activism, Steven cooperates with numerous other people and organizations to leverage ARC’s work to protect genital autonomy.  
Steven has represented plaintiffs in state and federal lawsuits to protect genital integrity.

Penn & Teller shot a full-length feature on male circumcision broadcast in 2005 in which Steven’s and ARC’s work are prominently featured. Montreal’s Sex TV shot a feature in 2006 in which Steven and ARC also figured prominently.  Steven was for several years the genital autonomy correspondent for KKZZ in Ventura, California, appearing on that radio station numerous times. Steven discusses the movement to promote genital autonomy in Cassie Jaye's excellent 2016 film about the men's movement, "The Red Pill," at a showing of which he met his wife.  

In April 2002, Steven received the Human Rights Award for his work with ARC from the International Symposium on Human Rights and Modern Society. ARC’s work has been recognized by Harvard Law School, the New York Times, the Wall Street Journal, Men’s Health Magazine, and numerous other well-known organizations and publications. Steven’s invited 2017 article on circumcision as iatrogenic (doctor-caused) wounding was held one of the ten most cited articles of the year that were published by the American Medical Association Ethics Journal. In November 2014, Steven was named by Intact America as Intactivist of the Month.
			Steven coauthored a gender studies textbook with Dr. Warren Farrell and Dr. James Sterba, published in 2008 by Oxford University Press and entitled, Does Feminism Discriminate Against Men?: A Debate. Steven served for over a quarter-century as Public Relations Director and Board Member of the National Coalition of Free Men (NCFM), the world’s largest and oldest organization promoting genuine gender equity. 
Steven remarried in 2018 to the former Gina Maria Mele, a business consultant with a Master's degree in neurobiology. He has two children.

In 2020-2021, Steven was one of three team members representing the plaintiff National Coalition for Men (NCFM) in a lawsuit in which NCFM challenged male-only draft registration as an unconstitutional violation of the rights of both women and men. In this case, NCFM was represented by the ACLU Women's Rights Project, Ruth Bader Ginsberg's employer prior to her joining the Supreme Court. (The ACLU Women's Rights Project took over the case after the tragic assassination of NCFM Vice-President and star litigator Marc Angelucci.) Steven did extensive work on the certiorari petition that asked the Supreme Court to hear the case. The request for certiorari was ultimately denied, with Justice Brett Kavanaugh playing a lead role in the denial of certiorari.

Publications
His publications include 1. “Newborn Male Circumcision is Unethical and should be Illegal,” with Peter Adler and Robert S. Van Howe, Journal of Law, Medicine, and Ethics, Summer 2016; 2. “Circumcision of Male Infants as a Human Rights Violation,” Journal of Medical Ethics, July 2013; 3. “Out of step: fatal flaws in the latest AAP policy report on neonatal circumcision,” with Robert S. Van Howe, Journal of Medical Ethics, July 2013; 4. “Tortured Bodies, Tortured Minds, Informed Consent as a Legal Fiction Inapplicable to Male Circumcision,” in The Rights of the Child: Ensuring Every Child's Fundamental Right to Body Ownership and Protection from Medical, Cultural, and Religious Infringements (G.C. Denniston et al., eds., Springer, 2012); 5. “Promoting Genital Autonomy by Exploring Commonalities Between Male, Female, Intersex, and Cosmetic Female Genital Cutting,” Global Discourse, Summer 2012; 6. “A Treatise from the Trenches: Why Are Circumcision Lawsuits So Hard to Win?” in Circumcision and Human Rights (G.C. Denniston et al., eds. Springer, 2008); 7. “A Rose by any other Name: Rethinking the Similarities and Differences between Male and Female Genital Cutting," with Robert Darby, Ph.D., Medical Anthropology Quarterly, Volume 21, Number 3 (September 2007), pp. 301-323; 8. “Gender Equity and Genital Integrity,” in Bodily Integrity and the Politics of Circumcision: Culture, Controversy, and Change (G.C. Denniston et al., eds., Plenum/Kluwer, 2006);  9. “Educating the United Nations about Male Circumcision,” in Flesh and Blood: Perspectives on the Problem of Circumcision in Contemporary Society (G.C. Denniston et al., eds., Plenum/Kluwer, 2003); 10. "The Limits of the Law: Comparative Analysis of Legal and Extralegal Methods to Control Child Body Mutilation Practices,” in Understanding Circumcision: A Multidisciplinary Approach to a Multidimensional Problem (G.C. Denniston et al., eds., Plenum/Kluwer, 2001); 11. "Prophylactic Interventions on Children: Balancing Human Rights with Public Health," with Frederick M. Hodges and Robert S. Van Howe, Journal of Medical Ethics, October 2001; and 12. "Informed Consent for Neonatal Circumcision: An Ethical and Legal Conundrum," with Robert S. Van Howe and James G. Dwyer, Journal of Contemporary Health Law and Policy, Winter 2000.

Steven coauthored a gender studies textbook with Dr. Warren Farrell and Dr. James Sterba, published in 2008 by Oxford University Press and entitled, Does Feminism Discriminate Against Men?: A Debate. Steven served for over a quarter-century as Public Relations Director and Board Member of the National Coalition of Free Men (NCFM), the world’s largest and oldest organization promoting genuine gender equity. In 2020-2021, he co-authored a brief to the United States Supreme Court that nearly resulted in the Supreme Court hearing a challenge to male-only draft registration as unconstitutional sex discrimination against both men and women. Steven is a proud husband of a Bay Area corporate consultant and a proud father of two children, born in 2002 and 2005.

References

External links 
 Attorneys for the Rights of the Child

Year of birth missing (living people)
Living people
Genital integrity activists
Harvard Law School alumni
American health activists